Dans Paris is a 2006 French romantic comedy-drama film written and directed by Christophe Honoré and starring Romain Duris, Louis Garrel, Guy Marchand, Joana Preiss, Alice Butaud and Marie-France Pisier.

Plot
After ending a volatile relationship with his long-term girlfriend Anna, Paul moves back in with his divorced father Mirko and younger brother Jonathan in their apartment in Paris. While attempting to pull Paul out of his depression, Jonathan engages in a series of sexual encounters with women around the city.

Cast
 Romain Duris as Paul
 Louis Garrel as Jonathan
 Guy Marchand as Mirko
 Joana Preiss as Anna
  as Alice
 Marie-France Pisier as the mother
 Helena Noguerra as the scooter girl
 Judith El Zein as the girl who thinks it is going to rain
  as the girl in the window
 Mathieu Funck-Brentano as the boy with the cigarette
 Lou Rambert Preiss as Loup

Release
The film was screened at the 2006 Cannes Film Festival, the 2006 Vienna International Film Festival, the 2006 BFI London Film Festival, the 2006 Flanders International Film Festival Ghent, the 2007 Rio de Janeiro International Film Festival, the 2007 São Paulo International Film Festival, and the 2007 San Francisco International Film Festival.

Reception
At Rotten Tomatoes, the film holds an approval rating of 60% based on 53 reviews, and an average rating of 6.25/10. The website's critics consensus reads, "Director Christophe Honore updates the pretensions and the charms of the French New Wave for Dans Paris, his poignant yet frustratingly dense film." At Metacritic, which assigns a normalized rating to reviews, the film has a weighted average score of 60 out of 100, based on 15 critics, indicating "mixed or average reviews".

Manohla Dargis of The New York Times praised the film's "playful, liberatory style", which she found reminiscent of the best films of the French New Wave. Paul Schrodt of Slant Magazine gave the film 3 out of 4 stars, writing, "As reckless as love itself, the movie has its ups and downs, but you can't help but be touched by it."

At the 32nd César Awards, Guy Marchand was nominated for the Best Supporting Actor award.

References

External links
 
 

2006 films
2006 romantic comedy-drama films
2000s French-language films
Films about brothers
Films directed by Christophe Honoré
Films set in Paris
Films shot in Paris
French romantic comedy-drama films
2000s French films